Franciscan College Gormanston is a school operated and managed by the Irish province of the Order of the Friars Minor. The college operates under the trusteeship of the Minister Provincial and Definitory of the Franciscan Province of Ireland. In September 2014, the school moved from being a fee-charging school to the free school scheme.

The college is situated in eastern County Meath close to the county border with Dublin. In 2018-2019, there were 434 students: 288 boys and 146 girls.

The college offers boarding and day facilities. Boarding at Gormanston is a mixture of five-day and seven-day boarding options for boys. Girls are admitted and welcome to the school as day students. International students must have an Irish contact either through an Agency or Guardianship.

Gormanston College is a public, coeducational Catholic secondary school under the trusteeship of the Franciscan Province of Ireland.

The college motto is Dei Gloriae, Hiberniae Honori.

Grounds 
The college consists mainly one building and is attached to the residential castle.  The grounds, straddling County Meath and County Dublin, contain a river, a wood and a small 9-hole golf course. There are several playing fields, in two different locations but contiguous with the college. The college and grounds are located between the Dublin–Belfast motorway and the old main Dublin–Drogheda road.  The eastern face of Gormanston Castle looks to the sea, down a long straight field, known as "Cromwells Avenue". A "yew walk" leads down to the graveyard, where several of the Order, both priests and nuns, as well as some students, are buried. The old coach road from Dublin to Belfast runs alongside the eastern college boundary walls.

History 

The apostolate of education has been a core ministry throughout the 800-year history of the Franciscan Order. Prior to the Reformation schools attached to the local Franciscan abbey/friary were a common feature of Franciscan ministry. With the closure of the monasteries in the reign of Henry VIII this apostolate came to an abrupt end. The gradual relaxation of the Penal Laws saw a re-structuring of the Order in Ireland and the opening of a number of schools, notably in Clonmel and Athlone.

The ministry of education carried out in Gormanston has its immediate roots in the Seraphic College opened at Capranica 50k North of the city of Rome in 1883. Originally intended as a training college for aspirants to the Franciscan Order it was decided to transfer the college to Multyfarnham Abbey Co. Westmeath in 1896 where it was to evolve into a secondary school. The new college dedicated to St. Louis was opened in 1899. By the 1940s Multyfarnham in size and location was deemed no longer adequate by the Order.

The Order had purchased the Gormanston Estate in 1947 and its proximity to Dublin made it an ideal and accessible location for a modern college. The first boarders were received in Gormanston in 1954 and the new college was opened in 1956. The first boarding students were received in 1954 and the new college was opened in 1957. The first students graduated from the College in 1957, a number of whom returned to become rectors at the College, Pat McSweeney OFM, Bob Doyle OFM, Paddy "Paddy" Timothy OFM.

Prior to the establishment of the school, Gormanston Castle and demesne had been in the possession of the Preston family who have been Viscounts Gormanston since the fourteenth century.  

In 2014, the school elected to enter the Free Education scheme, previous to that they had been a fee paying school. Fees are still charged for boarders.

Sex abuse scandal

In July 2006, Father Ronald Bennett, a former spiritual adviser, sports master and bursar of the college, pleaded guilty to the indecent assault of three boarders and one day pupil between 1974 and 1981. He was initially given to a five-year suspended sentence. On appeal the sentence was increased to 2½ years imprisonment and 2½ years suspended.

During the court hearings it emerged that the college authorities had been informed of the allegations at the time but despite promises to take action to prevent a recurrence of the abuse they had done nothing. This was confirmed by former pupil Dr. Richard Lanigan in a letter to the Irish Independent in March 2007.

At the Celebrations of the Diamond Jubilee of the school on 23 October 2014,  the Minister Provincial of the Franciscans in Ireland, Fr Hugh McKenna, said during mass that the order must acknowledge the 'shameful reality' that they had failed those students abused by Ronald Bennett.

'On behalf of the Franciscan Order I want to apologise unreservedly to each and every survivor for the pain and harm inflicted on those who suffered abuse while under the care of the friars.'

'I apologise for the breach of trust and the suffering victims and their families endured,' he said. 'I also know that no apology of mine can ever be sufficient. I acknowledge with deep shame that the Franciscan Order failed you.'

Sport 

A golf course, a six-lane 400 meter race track, an indoor sports complex with four multipurpose sports courts, a 25-yard indoor swimming pool and other sports facilities are in the college. The school takes part in sports such as GAA, soccer, rugby, tennis, badminton and sailing. Teams from the school won the Senior D Leinster (GAA) title in 2014 and the North Dublin Junior (rugby) league in 2012. Gormanston College won the Leinster Rugby senior development shield champions, defeating Tullamore College 22-20 in Donneybrook stadium on 16 May 2016. They followed this up by reaching the Vinny Murray cup in both 2017 and 2019. After defeats in the McMullen shield in 2018 to Ardscoil Na Trinoide and Gorey Community School in the McMullen cup in 2019, the senior team captured the Division 2A league in 2019 beat Wilson’s Hospital in the final.

Other functions 
During the school holidays the college plays host to the Irish beekeepers' summer school and the Stageworks Ireland Drama summer school. It also plays host to The National Basketball Camp that has been running for the last 32 years. The "Gormanston Camp", as it is now known, moved from Dungarvan 5 years ago and hosts basketball players from all over the country.

Notable alumni
 Frank Evers (businessman), track athlete 
 Colin Farrell, actor
 Jim Fitzpatrick, artist
 Jamie Hagan - rugby player
 John Joseph Lee - historian
 Seamus Martin, journalist, author, broadcaster
 John Meyler - footballer and hurler
 Charlie McCreevy, Fianna Fáil politician and E.U. Commissioner 
 Niall O'Dowd, US publisher and journalist
 James Reilly, Fine Gael politician, Minister for Health
 Fergal Reilly, Film Director, voice actor. 
 Matthew Sweeney, poet
 Michael White, judge
 Denis 'Ogie' Moran former Kerry Gaelic footballer and manager.

See also
 Education in the Republic of Ireland

References

External links

Gormanston College
8 Stageworks Ireland Drama Summer School 
Franciscan Province of Ireland

Catholic secondary schools in the Republic of Ireland
Secondary schools in County Meath
Schools in County Meath
Private schools in the Republic of Ireland
Franciscan high schools
Catholic boarding schools in Ireland
Educational institutions established in 1956
1956 establishments in Ireland